JAAPA: Journal of the American Academy of PAs is a peer-reviewed medical journal published by Wolters Kluwer on behalf of the American Academy of PAs. Its mission is to support the ongoing education and advancement of physician assistants by publishing current information and research on clinical, health policy, and professional issues. The journal is abstracted and indexed by MEDLINE/PubMed.

External links 
 

General medical journals
Monthly journals
Publications established in 1988
English-language journals